L'Orphelin des Astres (Orphan of the Stars) is volume seventeen in the French comic book (or bande dessinée) science fiction series Valérian and Laureline created by writer Pierre Christin and artist Jean-Claude Mézières.

Main characters
 Valérian, from Galaxity, lost capital of Earth in the 28th century, formerly a Spatio-Temporal Agent, now working on a freelance basis
 Laureline, from 11th century France, formerly a Spatio-Temporal Agent for Galaxity, now working on a freelance basis
 The Caliphon, fugitive son of the Caliph of Iksaladam
 The Mortis Quartet, a criminal gang who specialise in trafficking, smuggling, extortion, attacks, commandos, infiltrations and abductions
 Glü, a student of Interplanetary Commercial Law at the University of Shimballil and part-time pouzzouf delivery boy
 Ty Koün IV, cyberkinomax producer, owner of Paradise Studios
 Julius, Ty Koün's scriptwriter
 Professor Scharz-Metterklume, Department of Pedagogy, University of Shimballil, specialist in the celebrated method of Gonzo-Psycho-Pedagogy
 Mistress Karlä-Varlä, headmistress of the Star College

Setting
The Asteroids of Shimballil, time unknown. The asteroids are clustered close to a sun that provides warmth and are close enough together to trap a breathable atmosphere enabling inhabitants to travel between the asteroids without extensive life support equipment. We see many parts of the Asteroids in this album including:
 The hangars at the unfashionable end of Shimballil where Valérian and Laureline park their astroship and where the pouzzouf delivery business that Glü works for is located.
 Ty Koün IV's personal asteroid which contains his luxury home and grounds that include a lake and forest.
 Zakitab-The-Great-Market, where the population of Shimballil converge to trade their wares.
 The Free University of Shimballil. Each floor has a Department assigned to it. When a new Department is created a new floor is added. It is connected to the rest of the asteroids via a regular shuttle service and is supplied constantly by automated delivery trucks. The subjects it offers include:
 Antimatter Lifeforms
 Theological Biology
 Poetry
 Interplanetary Commercial Law
 Pedagogy
 The Cyberkinomax Studios including Mindmax Studios, Mega Kolossus Studios and Ty Koün IV Paradise Studios. They are very similar to movie studios with sound stages, actors, wardrobe, make-up etc. Each kinosaga episode is written and filmed once the market surveys are in and are tailored accordingly. Two days after distribution each episode is junked.
 The Diplomatic Quarter which is made up of impressive buildings protected by geostatic domes. Located in this quarter is the Star College which is modelled on the English public school Eton College right down to the uniforms. Its headmistress is the formidable Karlä-Varlä.

Notes
The Asteroids of Shimballil was originally the title of a proposed animated Valérian project in the early 1980s and the location was reused for this album. The Great Market at Zakitab is used in both stories. However, in The Asteroids of Shimballil, Shimballil is more primitive and the inhabitants have not discovered space travel. Orphan of the Stars appears to be set many years later – Shimballil has been colonised by the wealthiest denizens of the galaxy who have brought their sophisticated technology with them. The concept art and plot outline for The Asteroids of Shimballil were published as an appendix to the album release of Bad Dreams.

1998 graphic novels
Valérian and Laureline